Fiona "F. E." Higgins is an Irish children's author. She is known for her books The Bone Magician and The Black Book of Secrets, the latter of which was awarded a Bisto Honour Award in 2008. Born in Wicklow, she worked as a schoolteacher before becoming a full-time writer in 2000.

Bibliography

Tales from the Sinister City
The Black Book of Secrets (2007) 
The Bone Magician (2008) 
The Eyeball Collector (2009) 
The Lunatic's Curse (2010)

The Phenomenals
A Tangle of Traitors (2013)
A Game of Ghouls (2013)

Other 
The Perfect Enemy (part of the series Heroes of different authors)
New book coming 2020

References

External links
 
 
 

Irish children's writers
Irish fantasy writers
Irish women writers
Irish women children's writers
People from Wicklow (town)
Living people
Year of birth missing (living people)
Women science fiction and fantasy writers